KNIV (104.7 FM) is a radio station broadcasting a regional Mexican format. Licensed to Lyman, Wyoming, United States, it serves the Salt Lake City metropolitan area. The station is currently owned by Aerostar Communications, LLC.

Throughout the late 2000s, the station went through several formats before settling on adult album alternative, and becoming "104.7 The Point".

Until February 1, 2011, the station featured locally programmed music from the 1980s, 1990s, 2000s and today, formerly heard on 101.9 The End (KENZ). The End in April 2010 abandoned its adult album alternative (Triple A) format and then became "Gen X Radio," playing an eclectic mix of 1990s and 2000s Top 40 music. In early 2011, KENZ returned to its previous format, going against KYLZ for a short period of time.

On June 18, 2010, 3 Points Media, KYLZ's owners, announced that it was selling the station, along with KUDD and KUUU to Simmons Media Group. Pending FCC approval, the companies will continue to operate separately until a plan to divest several properties to comply with FCC ownership rules is announced.

On February 1, 2011, KYLZ changed its format to sports, branded as "The Zone", simulcasting KZNS 1280 AM Salt Lake City, Utah. On February 3, 2011, KYLZ changed its call letters to KZNS-FM to reflect the new format.

On July 7, 2011, KZNS-FM's sports format moved to KZZQ 97.5 FM Coalville, Utah (formerly active rock as "The Blaze"), while the 104.7 frequency changed its format to regional Mexican. On July 15, 2011, KZNS-FM (those calls moved to 97.5 FM) changed their call letters to KNIV.

Boosters

References

External links

NIV
Uinta County, Wyoming
Mass media in Utah
Radio stations established in 1984
1984 establishments in Wyoming